A tropical night is a term used in many European countries to describe days when the temperature does not fall under  during the night time.  This definition is in use in countries including the United Kingdom, Republic of Ireland, Spain, Sweden, Norway, the Netherlands, Germany, Finland, Lithuania, Latvia, Hungary, Serbia and Croatia. In the United States by contrast, the term "sultry nights"  is used when the temperature does not fall below  in the Gulf and Atlantic states.

Tropical nights are common during heat waves and occur mostly over seas, coasts and lakes. Heat gets stored in the water during periods of sunny and warm weather during the day, which is then emitted during the night and keeps the night temperature up.

United Kingdom
The Met Office began tracking 'tropical nights' in 2018. This criterion is infrequently met, with the 30 years between 1961 and 1990 seeing 44 tropical nights, most of them associated with the hot summers of 1976 and 1983. From 1991 to 11 August 2020, 84 such nights were recorded, with 21 of them occurring since 2008. Five nights that stayed above 20 °C were recorded in 2018, and four in 2019. By 11 August 2020, four tropical nights had been recorded for that year, one in June and three in August.

During the July 2022 heatwave, a tropical night recorded overnight from 18–19 July was reported to have been the warmest on record, where temperatures in many parts of the country did not fall below 25°C. The hottest night on record was set on 18 July 2022 in Croydon reaching 25.9°C smashing the previous record of 23.9°C in the country.

Croatia
In Croatia, this occurrence is usually termed 'warm night', but also  ('tropical night'). A 'very warm night' occurs when the temperature stays above  overnight. Tropical nights happen regularly at the seaside in summer, and less frequently inland. In the 1961–1990 period, there was an average of 10–20 tropical nights a month during the summer at the seaside, but less than one per year in most of continental Croatia. However, they have become more frequent in Zagreb since 2000. During 1990–2014, Zagreb recorded an increasing trend of 19.5 additional tropical nights per decade. In August 2018, the Zagreb–Grič Observatory registered 24 tropical nights, beating the previous record from 2003.

Ireland 
In Ireland, two tropical nights were observed at the Valentia Observatory in County Kerry during a heatwave in July 2021. This was the first time ever that two tropical nights were recorded in a row in Ireland.

See also
Heat wave
Urban heat island

References

Anomalous weather